The following is a list of American films released in 1929. The Broadway Melody won the Academy Award for Outstanding Picture at the 2nd Academy Awards, presented on April 3, 1930.

A–C

D–F

G–I

J–L

M–O

P–S

T–Z

See also
1929 in American television
1929 in the United States

References

External links

1929 films at the Internet Movie Database

Film
1929
Lists of 1929 films by country or language